Davide Merola (born 27 March 2000) is an Italian professional footballer who plays as a forward or a winger for  club Pescara, on loan from Empoli.

Club career
He began playing football in 2005, at the age of five, for Juve Sammaritana. Later he managed to get noticed with Capua by various observers from all over Italy. After having done several auditions, 2014 is bought by Inter. On 2 July 2017 he signed a youth registration contract to stay at Inter Milan until 2020. He debuted with Primavera on 10 September 2017 in a Campionato Primavera 1 against Udinese and marked the occasion by scoring a goal. With the Inter Milan youth sector he was twice the top scorer and also won the Supercoppa Primavera, Primavera Championship and Torneo Viareggio. On 11 March 2019, he was summoned to play in the first team and debuted three days later, on the occasion of the UEFA Europa League, against Eintracht Frankfurt.

On 20 August 2019 it was announced that Merola moved to Empoli.

On 4 October 2020, he was loaned to Arezzo. On 14 January 2021, he was sent on a new loan to Grosseto.

On 18 August 2022, Merola moved on loan to Serie B side Cosenza.

On 31 January 2023, Merola joined Serie C side Pescara on loan with a conditional obligation to buy. On 5 February, he scored a brace on his debut for the club, contributing to a 5–0 league win over Potenza.

International career
With the Italy U17 team he took part in the 2017 UEFA European Under-17 Championship and with the Italy U19 team in took part in the 2019 UEFA European Under-19 Championship.

Style of play
Merola has been described as classic striker who mainly operates inside the penalty area. Equipped with a very strong and precise shot, he is known for his lethal eye for goal, and became highly regarded for his goalscoring ability since the beginning of his career. Despite his diminutive stature and slender physique, he is also known for having a penchant for scoring goals with his head, due to his speed of execution. A highly technically gifted player, Merola is left-footed, and is also known for his ability on set pieces, often scoring from free kicks.

Career statistics

Club

Honours

Club

Inter Milan

 Supercoppa Primavera: 2017
 Campione Primavera: 2017
 Torneo di Viareggio: 2017

Individual
 Capocannoniere: 2016, 2017

References

External links

Davide Merola at Soccerbase.com

2000 births
Living people
People from Santa Maria Capua Vetere
Italian footballers
Association football forwards
Association football midfielders
Serie B players
Serie C players
Inter Milan players
Empoli F.C. players
S.S. Arezzo players
U.S. Grosseto 1912 players
Calcio Foggia 1920 players
Cosenza Calcio players
Delfino Pescara 1936 players
Italy youth international footballers
Italy under-21 international footballers
Footballers from Campania
Sportspeople from the Province of Caserta